Robert Stanton (born 15 April 1972 in Sydney, Australia) is a former Australian football (soccer) player and current assistant coach of Sydney's A-league side. He primarily played as a defender.

Club career
Stanton began his football career at the Australian Institute of Sport before signing with Sydney Croatia in the National Soccer League. He remained there until the close of the 1994–95 season before signing with Marconi-Fairfield. He enjoyed two seasons at Bossley Park before signing for Wollongong City FC, where he saw more regular starting appearances. Overall, his time at Wollongong was successful, playing 152 games for club and scoring seven goals. He was a part of two championship-winning squads, starting in the 1999–2000 NSL Grand Final at Subiaco Oval, Western Australia against Perth Glory. Stanton played the entire match but was one of only two Wolves players to not take a penalty in the 7–6 penalty shootout. The following year, Stanton made an appearance from the substitute bench in the 2000–01 winning grand final over South Melbourne at Parramatta Stadium, New South Wales. Stanton replaced goalscorer Sasho Petrovski in the 73rd minute with the Wolves leading, 2–0. The Wolves went on to win the championship, 2–1. He was also a part of the Oceania Club Championship-winning squad of the 2001 tournament. Stanton then dropped down to the NSW Premier League with the APIA Leichhardt Tigers for the 2003–04 season. He finished out his playing days at the Tigers before moving into coaching.

International career
Stanton represented Australia at youth tournaments but never achieved full senior cap.

Managerial career
Stanton began his coaching career as an assistant to his former Wollongong Wolves coach Ron Corry in the 2007 NSW Premier League season with Sutherland Sharks. Corry would leave the club in May, leaving Stanton as the caretaker for the rest of the season. In 2008, Stanton would go on to be an assistant at Penrith Nepean United and work with the Australian Deaf side. By 2009, Stanton would return to the Sharks as the senior head coach. He would make an immediate impact in his tenure, winning the Waratah Cup, Challenge Cup and the 2009 NSW Premier League Grand Final. He would continue at the club until resigning at the end of 2014 to take a position as Sydney FC Youth head coach.

Career stats

Club

Honours
With Wollongong Wolves:
  NSL Championship: 1999–2000, 2000–2001
 Oceania Club Championship: 2001

References

External links
 Oz Football profile

1972 births
Living people
Association football defenders
Australian soccer players
Australia international soccer players
Sydney United 58 FC players
Wollongong Wolves FC players
National Soccer League (Australia) players
Soccer players from Sydney
Australian Institute of Sport soccer players
Sportsmen from New South Wales